John Coney Moulton  (1886–1926) was born in St Leonards-on-Sea, Sussex, England, and died in London.  He was an officer in the British Army, as well as an amateur zoologist who spent many years in South-East Asia.

Career
He was Curator of the Sarawak Museum from November 1908 to January 1915, and founding editor of the Sarawak Museum Journal in 1911.  He served with his regiment The Wilts, in India 1915–1916 and as staff officer in Singapore 1916–1919, following which he resigned with the rank of Major.  In July 1919 he was appointed Director of the Raffles Museum in Singapore, a position he held until 1923. After this, Moulton returned to Sarawak as the Chief Secretary to the third White Rajah, Charles Vyner Brooke. Moulton specialised in research on cicadas. He was interested in entomology, birds and mammals.  Most of his scientific papers were published in the journals of the Straits and Malayan branches of the Royal Asiatic Society as well as in the Sarawak Museum Journal.

The genus Moultonianthus Merr. and many species of plants were named after him.

Personal life
The inventor Alex Moulton (9 April 1920 – 9 December 2012) was his son. After returning to England on 29 May 1926 for a 3-month break and visit to his ancestral home, The Hall, Bradford-on-Avon, he fell ill on the following day and was operated on for appendicitis in a London nursing home by Arbuthnot Lane but died there on 6 June at the age of 39. He is buried in a family grave with his parents and widow in the churchyard at Christ Church, Bradford-on-Avon.

References

Moulton, JC
Moulton, JC
Moulton, JC
Moulton, JC
Moulton, JC
British science writers
Officers of the Order of the British Empire
1886 births
1926 deaths
20th-century British zoologists
20th-century naturalists